Rockford University is a private university in Rockford, Illinois.  It was founded in 1847 as Rockford Female Seminary and changed its name to Rockford College in 1892, and to Rockford University in 2013.

History

Rockford Female Seminary was founded in 1847 as the sister college of Beloit College, which had been founded the year before.  The seminary's initial campus was on the east side of the Rock River, south of downtown Rockford. Anna Peck Sill served as principal for the first 35 years.

In 1890, the seminary's trustees voted to offer a full college curriculum, which led to the name changing to Rockford College in 1892.

Men were first granted admission to the university at the beginning of the 1955–1956 school year. At about this time, the school requested that the City of Rockford close parts of a street adjoining the campus.

In January 2008, Dr. Robert L. Head was named the university's seventeenth president, effective July 2008.

On October 2, 2012, the board of trustees voted unanimously to rename the college as a university. The trustees did so because the institution has many different academic departments. On July 1, 2013, the institution officially became Rockford University. In February 2016, Dr. Eric W. Fulcomer was named the university's eighteenth president, effective July 2016, and inaugurated on November 4, 2016.

Academics
The university offers approximately 80 majors, minors and concentrations, including the adult accelerated degree completion program for a B.S. in Management Studies. Through its Graduate Studies department, degree include the Master of Business Administration (MBA), Master of Arts in Teaching (MAT), and a Master of Education (MEd).

The university is organized into three colleges:
 Arts and Humanities
 Science, Math, and Nursing
 Social Sciences, Commerce and Education

The university offers an Honors Program in Liberal Arts & Sciences.  Also housed within the university are the Center for Nonprofit Excellence and the Center for Learning Strategies.

Departments
 Anthropology & Sociology
 Art & Art History
 Biology
 Chemical & Biological Sciences
 Classics
 Computer Science
 Economics, Business & Accounting
 Education
 English
 History
 Mathematics
 Modern & Classical Languages
 Nursing
 Performing Arts
 Philosophy
 Physical Education
 Physics
 Political Science
 Psychology

Honor societies
 Phi Beta Kappa - Scholastic
 Eta Sigma Phi - Classics
 Omicron Delta Epsilon - Economics
 Phi Alpha Theta - History
 Phi Sigma Iota - Foreign Language
 Pi Lambda Theta - Education
 Psi Chi - Psychology
 Sigma Beta Delta - Business

Athletics
The Rockford University Regents are Division III members of the National Collegiate Athletic Association. Teams compete independently or as members of the Northern Athletics Collegiate Conference.

The university fields men's teams in baseball, basketball, cross country, football, soccer, and track and field, and women's teams in basketball, cross country, soccer, softball, track and field, and volleyball. Their football team is the only team in college football since 2000 to score 100 points in a single game, beating Trinity Bible, 105–0 in 2003.

Recreational and intramural club sports (including basketball and dodgeball) are also available on campus.

Notable alumni 
 Jane Addams, activist and social worker
 Ellen Gates Starr, activist and social reformer
 Julia Lathrop, social reformer
 Ron Kowalke, American painter, printmaker, sculptor, and art educator
 Sandy Cole, state representative in Illinois
 Arthur A. Collins, radio engineer, researcher, entrepreneur
 Roger Cooper, politician
 Hind Rassam Culhane, professor
 Yvonne D'Arle, opera singer
 Jeannette Durno, pianist and music educator
 Jeannette Howard Foster, important lesbian theme writer/researcher
 Barbara Giolitto, politician
 Vivian Hickey, educator/politician
 Joyce Holmberg, educator/politician
 Betty Ann Keegan, politician
 Doris Lee, artist
 Helen Douglas Mankin, politician
 Catherine Waugh McCulloch, suffragist
 Ellen Spencer Mussey, pioneer in field of women's rights to education
 Anna E. Nicholes, social reformer, civil servant, clubwoman 
 Deb Patterson, women's basketball coach
 Mark Pedowitz, television executive
 Belle L. Pettigrew, educator, missionary
 Roland Poska, artist
 Barbara Santucci, children's author
 Robin Schone, author
 Harriet G. R. Wright, member of the Colorado House of Representatives

See also

 Female seminaries
 Women in education in the United States

References

Further reading
 Weaks-Baxter, Mary, et al. We Are a College at War: Women Working for Victory in World War II (Southern Illinois University Press; 2010) studies the mobilization of students in support of the war effort.
 Nelson, Hal, et al. Rockford College: A Retrospective Look (Rockford College, Rockford, IL; 1980).

External links
 
 Rockford University athletics website

 
Education in Rockford, Illinois
Educational institutions established in 1847
Buildings and structures in Rockford, Illinois
Tourist attractions in Rockford, Illinois
Female seminaries in the United States
1847 establishments in Illinois
Private universities and colleges in Illinois
Former women's universities and colleges in the United States